FIBA Oceania is a zone within FIBA (International Basketball Federation). It is one of FIBA's five continental confederations. FIBA Oceania is responsible for the organization and governance of the major international tournaments in Oceania. It has 22 FIBA Federations and is headquartered in Southport, Gold Coast, Queensland, Australia. The current FIBA Oceania President is Burton Shipley from New Zealand.

Its prime events were the FIBA Oceania Championship for men and the FIBA Oceania Women's Championship. The men's championship, established in 1971, was dominated by Australia. Yet, on some occasions, New Zealand defeated its rival, which was first accomplished in 1978. Australia was even more dominant in the women's tournament, first held in 1974; the Opals won all but one of its editions, with New Zealand winning only the 1993 edition.  Both Oceania Championships held their last editions in 2015. Since then, FIBA Oceania and FIBA Asia national teams compete for a single championship for each sex—the men's FIBA Asia Cup and the FIBA Women's Asia Cup.

Members

Top two FIBA Oceania teams 

C Current zone champions

* updated 28 November 2017

Competitions

Organized by FIBA Oceania 
 FIBA Oceania Championship
 FIBA Oceania Championship for Women
 FIBA Oceania Youth Tournament (Under-20)
 FIBA Oceania Youth Tournament for Women (Under-20)
 FIBA Oceania Under-18 Championship
 FIBA Oceania Under-18 Championship for Women
 FIBA Oceania Under-16 Championship
 FIBA Oceania Under-16 Championship for Women

Organized by FIBA Oceania subzones 
 FIBA Melanesian Basketball Cup
 FIBA Micronesian Basketball Cup
 FIBA Polynesian Basketball Cup
 FIBA Polynesian Basketball Cup for Women

Current champions

See also

References

External links 
 FIBA Oceania official website
 Basketball Australia official website
 Basketball New Zealand official website
 NBL official website
 WNBL official website
 Aussie Basketball
 Aussie BBall
 OZ Hoops Boards

 
Oce
Basketball in New South Wales
Bask
Sports organizations established in 1969